The 1973 season of the Venezuelan Primera División, the top category of Venezuelan football, was played by 9 teams. The national champions were Portuguesa.

Results

Standings

Second Place Playoff

External links
Venezuela 1973 season at RSSSF

Ven
Venezuelan Primera División seasons
Prim